Erasmus "Rassie" Pieterse (born 23 August 1983) is a South African field hockey player, who plays as a goalkeeper.  At the 2012 Summer Olympics, he competed for the national team in the men's tournament.

He retired after the Olympics, back to his day job as Managing Director of TK Sports.

References

External links
 
 
 
 
 

1983 births
Living people
South African male field hockey players
2010 Men's Hockey World Cup players
Field hockey players at the 2012 Summer Olympics
2014 Men's Hockey World Cup players
Field hockey players at the 2014 Commonwealth Games
2018 Men's Hockey World Cup players
Field hockey players at the 2020 Summer Olympics
Olympic field hockey players of South Africa
Male field hockey goalkeepers
People from Matjhabeng Local Municipality
Commonwealth Games competitors for South Africa
Field hockey players from Johannesburg